Allakh-Yun is an urban locality (an urban-type settlement) in Ust-Maysky District of the Sakha Republic, Russia, located  from Ust-Maya, the administrative center of the district, in the Yudoma-Maya Highlands on the right bank of the Allakh-Yun River, after which it was named. As of the 2010 Census, its population was 96.

History
It was founded in the 1930s as the first gold prospecting center in the region and was granted urban-type settlement status in 1937. The surrounding territory was separated out of Ust-Maysky District in 1940 as Allakh-Yunsky District, with the administrative center in Allakh-Yun. In 1948, the administrative center was moved to Eldikan and in 1953, the district was merged back into Ust-Maysky District. With the cessation of mining activities in the 1990s, almost the entire population left.

Administrative and municipal status
Within the framework of administrative divisions, the urban-type settlement of Allakh-Yun is incorporated within Ust-Maysky District as the Settlement of Allakh-Yun. Within the framework of municipal divisions, Allakh-Yun is located on the intersettlement territory of Ust-Maysky Municipal District.

Transportation
This is its only connection to the outside world, since the closure of the small local airport in the 1990s.

Climate
Allakh-Yun has a monsoon-influenced, extreme subarctic climate (Koppen climate classification Dwd) with long, extremely cold and dry winters and short, very mild summers.

References

Notes

Sources
Official website of the Sakha Republic. Registry of the Administrative-Territorial Divisions of the Sakha Republic. Ust-Maysky District. 

Urban-type settlements in the Sakha Republic